The Mount Carmel College of Baler (Kolehiyong Monte Carmelo ng Baler in Filipino), commonly referred to as MCC Baler or MCCB, is the oldest Catholic mission school in the Philippine province of Aurora. It was founded in 1948 by the American Carmelites, who arrived in Baler upon the invitation of Doña Aurora Aragon-Quezon (1888–1949), former First Lady of the Philippines (1935–1944), wife of the late Philippine Commonwealth President Manuel Luis Quezon, and upon the approval of Alfredo F. Versoza, then bishop of Lipa. It is currently a member of the Catholic Association of Schools in the Prelature of Infanta (CASPI).

History

1940s–1960s

Catholicism took a new life in Baler when three pioneering Discalced Carmelite (OCD) friars arrived in 1947 upon the invitation of Doña Aurora. Soon after, Mount Carmel High School of Baler (MCHS Baler), now known as Mount Carmel College of Baler (MCC Baler), was built near the San Luis Obispo de Tolosa Parish, the historic Baler Catholic Church, to fill the need for an evangelical mission in this town.

The school started its operation on June 23, 1948, with 96 students, six of whom were seniors who received their diplomas at the end of the school year. It was incorporated with the Securities and Exchange Commission (SEC) on August 9, 1951.

The grade school opened with 35 enrollees in 1956. Government recognition for the entire grade school department came in 1959.

The college department was opened on June 12, 1961, with one-year commercial science and liberal arts (AB) programs as main offerings, with Dr. José M. Manalo as the first college dean. Government recognition for the Bachelor of Science in Education (BSEd) and the Bachelor of Science in Elementary Education (BSEEd) programs came in 1962. The areas of specialization for Bachelor of Science in Education (BSEd) were given permit by the government in 1966.

Meanwhile, the 1960's saw the strengthening of Catholic education with the organizations of the Legion of Mary, the Solidarity of Our Lady, and the Catechists’ Club. The student aide education program was likewise introduced in the 1960s to help the financially poor but academically capable students finish college.

The Carmelite Missionary (CM) sisters arrived in August 1965 and assisted the Carmelite fathers in the school administration until 1982.

1970s–1990s

Such programs as the Bachelor of Science in Commerce (BSC), with a major in economics, was offered in 1978, and BSC, with a major in accounting, in 1985, but the latter was phased out in 1993.

The 1970s, which marked the growth of social awareness, challenged the school to "direct its education for social justice and respect for the dignity of persons." The school thus defined its thrust towards the "formation of Christians who are witnesses to God’s love and are active participants in the improvement of life in the locality."

The school had a consortium with the Philippine Wesleyan College (PWC), now the Wesleyan University of the Philippines (WUP), from 1977 to 1981 for a graduate program in administration and supervision.

Upon the invitation of the Most Reverend Bp/ Julio Xavier Labayen, OCD, DD, bishop of the Prelature of Infanta, the Franciscan Sisters of the Immaculate Conception (SFIC) arrived in 1982. Since then, the school administration has been entrusted the formulation of the mission statement of Mount Carmel schools in the prelature.

The mission statement of the prelature necessitated the formulation of the mission statement of Carmel schools in the prelature, which could define the thrust to build the church of the poor. Thus, the school formulated its first mission statement in 1987 with its programs and activities geared toward holistic human formation of its academic community.

An agreement with Saint Joseph's College of Quezon City (SJCQC) for extension of classes in the masteral level for faculty upgrading took effect from 1987 to 1991.

The need for a more relevant and contextualized Christian formation program (CFP) was felt in 1990 which led to the setting up of the CFP Office headed by a coordinator.

For the first time, the school hosted the CASPI assembly on July 16, 1990, the day when the 1990 Luzon earthquake shook the province and other nearby provinces.

The research and development office (RDO) was set up in 1992 to conduct research and evaluation studies as baseline data for planning and decision-making. One of its first outputs was the review and reformulation of the 1987 mission statement of the school.

The first alumni homecoming was held on December 28, 1994, with approximately 500 attendees who were high school and college graduates.

Aspiring to be truly with the Church of the poor, the school consequently aligned its thrust and objectives, such as the promotion of the fullness of life and the nurturance of humanizing relationships, with the 1995 mission statement of the prelature.

The "Panalangin ng Carmelian" (literally, "Prayer of a Carmelian") was formulated in 1995 by the college so as to further strengthen devotion to Mary, mother of Christ, whom the prelature called "ina ng sambayanan ng mga dukha" ("mother of the poor people"). Originally written in Filipino, it has been one of the most recited prayers in school programs and activities since then.

An agreement with SJCQC for the conduct of graduate school extension classes was renewed in 1995 and lapsed in 1998.

The school served as an evacuation center for the people of Baler who were affected by flash floods on December 24, 1995.

To keep pace with the technological progress, the school offered new programs, such as the Bachelor of Science in Accountancy (BSA), the Computer Secretarial, and the Computer Science, in the academic year 1995–1996. The Bachelor of Secondary Education (BSEd), major in religious education, was offered in the school year 1997–1998 to grant the request for teachers of Christian formation subjects.

The school celebrated its golden jubilee on February 18, 1998, the same day when one of its buildings, the Aurora Building, was dedicated in loving memory of Doña Aurora.

The Bishop Julio Xavier Labayen scholarship fund for the financially poor but academically capable students of the prelature was launched on July 23, 1999, the same day when a two-storey retreat house was dedicated to the bishop.

2000–present
The Bachelor of Science in Criminology (BSCrim) program was offered in 2003.

The basic education and the higher education departments of the school were restructured in 2004.

The mission statement of the school was revised in 2007 with the inclusion of the Carmelian spirit of prayer, compassion, and prophetic action. The vision and mission of the school were reformulated as follows: “We, the Catholic schools in the Prelature of Infanta, inspired by the Blessed Trinity, strive towards the holistic formation of the person and society in communion with the Church, the community, and the family under the maternal care of Our Lady of Mount Carmel. We commit ourselves to follow Jesus Christ and the Gospel values, with openness to formation, imbued with the Carmelian spirit of prayer, compassion, and prophetic action, as we continually strive for quality education in the service of the Church and society."

The school celebrated its diamond jubilee on February 18, 2008.

For the second time, the school hosted the CASPI assembly from July 16 to 19, 2013.

The groundbreaking ceremony for the college extension campus in Barangay Pingit, Baler was held on December 28, 2013. It was attended by the school administrator, faculty, staff, studentry, and alumni.

In 2016, the vision and mission of the school were revised as follows: “The Mount Carmel College of Baler as a member of the Catholic Association of Schools in the Prelature of Infanta and mission partner in building the Church of the poor, inspired by the Blessed Trinity, envisions to be a center of holistic formation of the person in communion with the family, the Church, and the community under the maternal care of Our Lady of Mount Carmel. We follow Jesus Christ, the center and life, by living the Carmelian spirit of prayer, compassion, and prophetic action, as we continually strive for quality education in the service of the Church of the poor.”

In June 2016, MCC Baler, in partnership with the College of the Immaculate Conception (CIC) (Cabanatuan), opened graduate programs such as Master of Arts in Education (MAEd), with majors in educational management, early childhood education (ECE), guidance and counseling, English, Filipino, mathematics, sociology, and physical education (PE).

Notable faculty
Dr. José M. Manalo, Filipino author of English language books, lecturer, and university and college professor who became the first college dean when MCHS Baler became MCC Baler on July 11, 1961, with commercial science and liberal arts programs as main offerings

Notable alumni
John Arcilla, high school class of 1983, multi-awarded Filipino movie actor and environmentalist
Rommel N. Angara, high school class of 1997, college class of 2013, Tagalog poet and essayist.

Degree, non-degree, and graduate programs
Currently, the higher education department of MCC Baler offers seven Commission on Higher Education (CHED) programs and three Technical Education and Skills Development Authority (TESDA) programs. Its CHED programs are the Bachelor of Arts (AB), major in history, philosophy, and sociology; the Bachelor of Secondary Education (BSEd), major in biological science, mathematics, English, Filipino, social studies, and values education; the Bachelor of Elementary Education (BEEd) with specializations in general content area and in preschool education; the Bachelor of Science in Office Administration (BSOA); the Bachelor of Science in Business Administration (BSBA), major in financial management, human resource development and management, and marketing management; the Bachelor of Science in Criminology (BSCrim); and the Teacher Certificate Program (TCP). Its TESDA programs are the Caregiver Training Program, the Personal Computer (PC) Operation, and the Computer Hardware Servicing NC II.

In June 2016, MCC Baler, in partnership with the College of the Immaculate Conception (CIC) (Cabanatuan), opened graduate programs such as Master of Arts in Education (MAEd), with majors in educational management, early childhood education (ECE), guidance and counseling, English, Filipino, mathematics, sociology, and physical education (PE).

Professional examinations
MCC Baler produced college graduates of education and criminology who traditionally performed well in licensure examinations. Its BEEd and BSEd graduates of 2013 obtained 100% passing rates in the September 29, 2013, Licensure Examination for Teachers (LET). A year earlier, its BEEd and BSEd graduates of 2012 obtained passing rates of 100% and 66.67%, respectively, for first timers in the September 30, 2012, LET. Its BSCrim graduates of 2011 obtained a passing rate of 59.26% for first timers in the October 2011 Criminologist Licensure Examination (CLE).

Controversies
Philippine Senator Edgardo J. Angara called MCC Baler a "bulok na paaralan," that is, literally, a "rotten school," in his speech delivered on August 19, 2011, at the municipal plaza of Baler across the San Luis Obispo de Tolosa Parish on the occasion of the 402nd founding anniversary of this town attended by local government officials and employees, teachers and students, and other townspeople. He unleashed a broadside against the Prelature of Infanta, accusing it of "claiming possession of the municipal plaza and the lot where the college stands." He waved to the crowd photocopies of documents allegedly showing that the plaza has been owned by the parish and the college grounds by the municipal government since 1929. He said that the prelature was able to transfer in its name possession of the plaza and the college site in 1980. He suggested that the college now being run by the parish "be vacated and transferred to another site to pave the way for the restoration of the Baler church." He noted that the college building is an eyesore as it was built "higher than the church, obstructing the religious structure from public view." In a more conciliatory tone, he said that he offered Php30,000,000 as assistance to the local parish to transfer to a better location where it could put up a brand-new campus complete with playground and academic facilities. He mentioned that in 2007 he already made the offer, but it was refused. He clarified that the national government, through his representation, has been providing assistance for MCC Baler students, contrary to the prelature's claim that it was the one helping them. He further said that for the last five years these students received a total of Php26,000,000 in subsidy from the national government through the Government Assistance to Private Education (GASTPE) program which he authored in the Senate. A few weeks later, the prelature issued an official written statement posted on the college bulletin, vehemently denying all of the senator's accusations, calling them as pure fabrications, particularly the alleged 30-million offer for the parish to transfer to another site where it could build a new school.

Sister schools

In the province of Aurora, other Carmel schools in partnership with MCC Baler are Mount Carmel College of Casiguran (MCC Casiguran) (founded in 1968), Mount Carmel School of Dinalungan (MCS Dinalungan), Saint Patrick's Academy (founded in 1968) in Dingalan, Father John Karash Memorial High School (founded in 1966) in Dipaculao, Mount Carmel School of Maria Aurora (MCS Maria Aurora) (founded in 1952), Mount Carmel School of San Luis (MCS San Luis) (founded in 1962), and Our Lady of Consolacion Learning Center (OLaConLeC) in San Luis.

In the province of Quezon, other Carmel schools in touch with MCC Baler are Mount Carmel High School of Burdeos (MCHS Burdeos) (founded in 1949), Mount Carmel High School of General Nakar (MCHS General Nakar) (founded in 1990), Mount Carmel School of Infanta (MCS Infanta) (founded in 1962), SIDS in Patnanungan, and Mount Carmel School of Polillo (MCS Polillo) (founded in 1962).

References

Educational institutions established in 1948
Catholic universities and colleges in the Philippines
Private universities and colleges in the Philippines
Universities and colleges in Aurora (province)
Catholic secondary schools in the Philippines
Catholic elementary schools in the Philippines
1948 establishments in the Philippines